Oghlu may refer to:

oğlu, an Azerbaijani and Turkish word meaning 'son of', notably used in Azerbaijani names and Turkish names
Ughli, a village in Iran